The Edward D. & Vina Shattuck Beals House is located in Neenah, Wisconsin.

History
Edward D. Beals was an industrialist. His wife, Vina Shattuck, was a Kimberly-Clark heiress. The house was added to the State Register of Historic Places in 2007 and to the National Register of Historic Places the following year.

The Franklyn C. Shattuck House, located in Neenah and having belonged to Vina's father, is also listed on the both registers.

References

Houses on the National Register of Historic Places in Wisconsin
National Register of Historic Places in Winnebago County, Wisconsin
Houses in Winnebago County, Wisconsin
Late 19th and Early 20th Century American Movements architecture
Brick buildings and structures
Houses completed in 1911